Single Collection is the first Greatest Hits-esque release by Hitomi Yaida, giving a selection of her singles released up to the time of issue. It was also issued as part of the Single collection/Yaiko's selection Box Set. Released in 2004, it peaked at No. 3 on the Japanese albums chart.

Track listing

References

Hitomi Yaida albums
2004 compilation albums